Laghman (ләғмән;) is a dish of meat, vegetables and pulled noodles from Uyghur cuisine and Central Asian cuisine. In Chinese, the noodle is known as latiaozi or bànmiàn. 

As native Turkic words do not begin with the letter 'L', läghmän is a loanword from the Chinese lamian and appears to be an adaptation of Han Chinese noodle dishes, although its taste and preparation are distinctly Uyghur. It is also a traditional dish of the Hui or Dungan people who call the dish bànmiàn.

It is especially popular in Kazakhstan and Kyrgyzstan, where it is considered a national dish of the local Uyghur and Dungan (Hui) ethnic minorities. It is also popular in Russia, Uzbekistan, Tajikistan, Turkmenistan and Northeastern Afghanistan, where chickpeas are added to it and parts of Northern Pakistan. The Crimean Tatar cuisine also adopted lagman from the Uzbek culture.

Cooking 
Lagman is prepared with meat (mainly lamb or beef), vegetables and pulled long noodles. The vegetables usually include Bulgarian peppers, eggplants, radish, potatoes, onions, garlic, and spices.

See also 

 Ramen
 Lamian
 Cellophane noodles
 List of noodle dishes

References 

Afghan cuisine
Crimean cuisine
Kazakhstani cuisine
Kyrgyz cuisine
Pakistani cuisine
National dishes
Russian cuisine
Tajik cuisine
Turkmenistan cuisine
Uyghur cuisine
Uzbekistani cuisine
Mixed noodles
Noodle soups
Dungan